Summer's Desire is a 2018 Chinese romance television series directed by Yu Zhongzhong and co-produced by iQiyi and Youhug Media. It is based on the 2007 novel Summer of Foam by Ming Xiaoxi. There is also a 2010 television series version and a 2016 film version. It stars Zhang Xueying, Qin Junjie, Madina Memet and Huang Shengchi. The series is premiered on Zhejiang Television in China on 8 May 2018. The series centres on the love story of Yin Xiamo, Ou Chen and Luo Xi.

Synopsis
Yin Xiamo (Zhang Xueying) becomes an orphan during her childhood. She pursues her acting career and takes care of her sick younger brother at the same time. She signs up with an entertainment company and won the second place in a selection contest. She rose to fame after releasing her debut solo album. She is discovered by Ou Chen (Qin Junjie), the co-founder of Oushi Group, a game company. She stars in a television series produced by Oushi Group, which received critical and popular acclaim. However, in the fierce market competition, the company has encountered operational difficulties. On the verge of bankruptcy, they go through the difficulties together and finally achieves the cause of both sides, and also gains a happy love.

Cast

Main
 Zhang Xueying as Yin Xiamo, an actress who met Ou Chen during her childhood before she lost her parents.
 Lü Chenyue as young Yin Xiamo.
 Qin Junjie as Ou Chen, the co-founder of Oushi Group, a game company.
 Wen Chundi as young Ou Chen.
 Huang Shengchi as Luo Xi, an orphan who loves Yin Xiamo.
 Madina Memet as Shen Qiang, an Asian superstar who loves Luo Xi.

Supporting
 Chen Xinyu as Yao Shu'er, the senior sister apprentice of Yin Xiamo.
 Huang Deyi as Yin Cheng, Yin Xiamo's younger brother.
 Yuan Ziyun as Zhen En, Yin Xiamo's close friend.
 Song Haijie as Dai Wei (David), Ou Chen's partner.
 Liu Jia as Fang Jinhua
 Zhu Xiangyang as Song Yamin
 Li Yinan as Xi Meng (Simon)
 Xie Xintong as Pan Nan, Yin Xiamo's friend.
 Ding Ke'er as Lin Kexin
 Duan Ziyi as Wei Yin
 Wang Yijia as Jie Ni (Jenny), the broker of Luo Xi.

Soundtrack

Production
Production started in July 2017 in Suzhou and ended in Sanya in October of the same year.

Ratings

 Highest ratings are marked in red, lowest ratings are marked in blue

Awards and nominations

Broadcast

References

External links
 

2018 Chinese television series debuts
2018 Chinese television series endings
Television shows based on Chinese novels
Chinese romance television series
Television series by Youhug Media
Summer's Desire